The Women's road race of the 2016 UCI Road World Championships took place in and around Doha, Qatar on 15 October 2016. Lizzie Deignan was the defending champion, having won the world title in 2015. Deignan was unable to defend her title, as she finished fourth in the bunch sprint finish.

The gold medal and rainbow jersey went to 20-year-old Danish rider Amalie Dideriksen, who became the youngest rider in a decade to win the title, and only the fifth rider to win both the junior and elite world titles, having won the junior title in 2013 and 2014. She finished ahead of Kirsten Wild of the Netherlands, while the bronze medal went to Finland's Lotta Lepistö.

Course
The race started at the Qatar Foundation in Education City before the race made its way towards The Pearl-Qatar, with  being completed before the first passage of the finish line.

Schedule
All times are in Arabia Standard Time (UTC+03:00).

Participating nations
146 cyclists from 46 nations were entered in the women's road race, with 142 riders taking the start. The numbers of cyclists per nation are shown in parentheses.

Final classification

References

Women's road race
UCI Road World Championships – Women's road race
2016 in women's road cycling